Friedrich Lüthi (19 December 1850 – 16 March 1913 in Geneva) was a Swiss sport shooter who competed in the late 19th century and early 20th century. He participated in Shooting at the 1900 Summer Olympics in Paris and won a gold medal with the Military pistol team for Switzerland.

References

External links
 

Swiss male sport shooters
ISSF pistol shooters
Olympic gold medalists for Switzerland
Olympic shooters of Switzerland
Shooters at the 1900 Summer Olympics
1850 births
1913 deaths
Place of birth missing
Olympic medalists in shooting
Medalists at the 1900 Summer Olympics